was a Japanese politician. He was born in Fukuoka, Fukuoka. He was governor of Nagano Prefecture (1897–1898). He served in the House of Representatives of the Empire of Japan.

References

Governors of Nagano
Members of the House of Representatives (Empire of Japan)
People from Fukuoka
1845 births
1915 deaths